The Sutton Range is a mountain range on Vancouver Island, British Columbia, Canada, located in the area between the headwaters of the Nimpkish River and those of the White River. It has an area of 448 km2 and is a subrange of the Vancouver Island Ranges which in turn form part of the Insular Mountains.

See also
List of mountain ranges

References

External links

Vancouver Island Ranges
Mountain ranges of British Columbia